The Sharjah Cricket Stadium is in Sharjah in the United Arab Emirates. It holds the record for the most ODIs hosted in a venue with 240 ODIs up to December 2019. It was originally constructed in the early 1980s and has been much improved over the years. It hosted its first international matches in April 1984, in the Asia Cup. The stadium was one of the dedicated venues for the 2021 ICC Men's T20 World Cup.

In 2010, at the behest of local cricketing patron Abdul Rahman Bukhatir, the Sharjah Cricket Stadium became the home ground for the Afghanistan cricket team for One Day International and first-class matches. In 2016, Afghanistan changed their home ground to Greater Noida Sports Complex Ground in Noida, India. The Multan Sultans and the Quetta Gladiators used the Sharjah Cricket Stadium for most of their home games in the most recent PSL season.

The cricket stadium also hosted the inaugural edition of the T10 cricket league, which is a 90-minute cricket league from 14 to 17 December 2017 featuring several international cricket players.

The stadium also hosted the final of the 2018 Blind Cricket World Cup featuring India and Pakistan with India defeating Pakistan by 2 wickets to secure the Blind Cricket World Cup title. It has 62 metre boundaries in long on and 58 metre in straight. It has 65 metre boundary in mid wicket.

Test matches
Sharjah cricket stadium is one of the few Test Cricket Grounds at which a Test match has been played not involving a home country participant (and the only one in a non-Test playing country) Sharjah was the venue for four Test matches in 2002. Because of security and safety concerns in Pakistan and its aftermath) the ground was chosen as a neutral venue to host two Test matches between Pakistan and the West Indies in February and two Test matches between Pakistan and Australia in October.

The fifth Test match held at the ground took place in November 2011, as the third Test between Sri Lanka and Pakistan. The other games in the series were played at the Sheikh Zayed Stadium, Abu Dhabi and Dubai International Cricket Stadium.

One Day Internationals
Between 1984 and 2003, the Sharjah ground was the venue for 206 One Day Internationals held as part of commercially sponsored one day tournaments involving three or four international teams. Sharjah was a popular venue attracting good crowds mostly from the South Asian population of the United Arab Emirates. The tournaments were organised by "The Cricketers Benefit Fund Series (CBFS)" which had been established in 1981 by Abdul Rahman Bukhatir, and whose main aim was to honour cricketers of the past and present generations from India and Pakistan, with benefit purses in recognition of their services to the game of cricket. The stadium initially started with a few limited seats and very modest facilities but by 2002 had a 17,000 capacity and floodlights.

Since 2003 the increasingly crowded cricket calendar has precluded the holding of any major international matches at Sharjah although the stadium has been the venue for certain other matches, for example in the 2004 ICC Intercontinental Cup. It has also been used by the Afghanistan national team since 2010. In 2011, the Guinness Book of Records recorded the Sharjah stadium as hosting the greatest number of one-day matches.  , 240 ODIs had been played at the ground.

ICC Men's T20 World Cup
The venue hosted 11 group-stage matches during 2021 ICC Men's T20 World Cup.

Indian Premier League 
The UAE has hosted matches in the Indian Premier League, with matches being played on the ground on each occasion. The 2014 season was played in the UAE due to the 2014 Indian general election and parts of both the 2020 and 2021 season were played in the country due to the widespread outbreak of COVID-19 in India.

Records

T20Is
 On 24 November 2013, Samiullah Shinwari took a five wicket haul against Kenya.
 On 25 October 2021, Mujeeb Ur Rahman  took a five wicket haul against Scotland.
 On 6 November 2021, Kagiso Rabada took a hat-trick against England in a 2021 ICC Men's T20 World Cup's super 12 Match.

See also
List of Test cricket grounds
Rashid Alleem Premier League

References 

Sport in Sharjah (city)
Cricket grounds in the United Arab Emirates
Test cricket grounds in the United Arab Emirates